Indukuru is a village in Devipatnam Mandal, Alluri Sitharama Raju district in the state of Andhra Pradesh in India.

Geography 

Demographics 
 India census, Indukuru had a population of 2025, out of which 975 were male and 1050 were female. The population of children below 6 years of age was 11%. The literacy rate of the village was 62%.

References 

Villages in Devipatnam mandal